Rosice is a municipality and village in Chrudim District in the Pardubice Region of the Czech Republic. It has about 1,400 inhabitants.

Administrative parts
Villages of Bor u Chroustovic, Brčekoly and Synčany are administrative parts of Rosice.

History
There were originally two separate villages in the area of today's Rosice, called Rosice and Seslávky. The first written mention of Seslávky is from after 1131, the first written mention of Rosice is from 1318.

References

External links

Villages in Chrudim District